Thomas Loates (6 October 1867 – 1910), born in Derby, England, was a three times British flat racing Champion Jockey and one of only seven jockeys to have won more than 200 races in a season in Great Britain. He won the English Triple Crown on Isinglass in 1892, as well as individual Classics on Donovan (1889 Derby) (for which he was a last-minute booking), Siffleuse (1893 1,000 Guineas) and St. Frusquin (1896 2,000 Guineas).  On Isinglass, he also won the 1894 Eclipse and 1895 Ascot Gold Cup and he had another top class win on Desmond in Newmarket's July Stakes in 1898.

Life
Loates was regarded as the best of a family of four jockey brothers which included fellow Classic-winner, Sam Loates.

He was apprenticed to Joseph Cannon at Newmarket and was known as "a good lightweight, with very good hands". For Donovan's Derby win, he weighed just 6 1/2 stone.  Loates once narrowly escaped death when falling in the Liverpool Cup on Lord Derby's race mare Birch Rod.  He was also badly injured in a fall at Manchester and later married the nurse who tended him. A low point for Loates came in 1891 when his licence to ride was withdrawn by the Jockey Club for his involvement in betting, but he was reinstated the following year.

He died in Brighton, England in 1910, leaving $1,250,000 in property. It was believed he had amassed this phenomenal sum ($31.8 million in 2013 prices) because his later employer was the financier Leopold de Rothschild who looked after his investments.

Brighton & Hove Bus Number 415 is named in honour of him.

References

British jockeys
1867 births
1910 deaths
British Champion flat jockeys
Sportspeople from Derby